Someone Has to Die is a Spanish-Mexican thriller streaming television limited series created by Manolo Caro, creator of the Netflix series The House of Flowers. The series takes place in 1950s Spain and consists of three episodes revolving around a conservative and traditional society during the Franco regime "where appearances and family ties play a key role". The series features an all-star cast, including Carmen Maura and Caro regular Cecilia Suárez. All three episodes were released simultaneously by Netflix on October 16, 2020.

Synopsis 
A young man is recalled to Spain from Mexico by his wealthy family after a 10-year absence as they have found a suitable young woman for him to marry. However, he brings a male ballet dancer with him, sending shockwaves through his conservative town.

Cast 
An extensive cast list was published in October 2019 by Cosmopolitan.

 Carmen Maura as Amparo Falcón
 Cecilia Suárez as Mina Falcón
 Ernesto Alterio as Gregorio Falcón
 Alejandro Speitzer as Gabino Falcón
 Isaac Hernández as Lázaro
 Ester Expósito as Cayetana Aldama
 Carlos Cuevas as Alonso Aldama
 Mariola Fuentes as Rosario
 Pilar Castro as Belén Aldama 
 Juan Carlos Vellido as Santos Aldama 
 Eduardo Casanova as Carlos 
 Manuel Morón as Don Federico

Production 
After his successful Netflix series The House of Flowers, Caro was signed to an exclusive deal with the streaming company, and began production on a new three-part miniseries, Someone Has to Die. As well as co-producing and directing, Caro co-wrote the show with Fernando Pérez and Monika Revilla; Caro's production company, Noc Noc Cinema, is credited as the main production company on the show. The show deals with themes of homophobia, conservatism, family, and change against a backdrop of 1950s Spain.

The show is Caro's first work entirely made in Spain, and his first non-comedic work. Some parts of the second season of The House of Flowers had been set in Spain, with Manuel Betancourt of Remezcla suggesting that the country had become his "latest muse". The show began filming in Madrid on 23 October 2019.

Caro has called the cast of the show "a dream"; he had worked with several of them before: Suárez is his constant collaborator and Casanova was in the Spanish scenes of The House of Flowers. Betancourt wrote that the inclusion of "Pedro Almodóvar's OG muse" in Maura made the series a "must-see event". Maura had visited Caro and Suárez while they were filming in Madrid for The House of Flowers in February 2019 to discuss the show. It is the first acting role for Mexican ballet dancer Hernández, who is "considered one of the best dancers in the world". John Hopewell of Variety wrote that, by putting actors like Maura and Suárez together, Caro was "furthering [the] Spanish-language star system".

Episodes

Awards and nominations 

|-
| align = "center" | 2021 || 32nd GLAAD Media Awards || colspan = "2" | Outstanding Spanish-Language Scripted Television Series ||  || 
|}

References 

Spanish-language Netflix original programming
Mexican LGBT-related television shows
Spanish LGBT-related television shows
2020s Mexican drama television series
2020 Mexican television series debuts
2020 Mexican television series endings
2020s Spanish drama television series
2020 Spanish television series debuts
2020 Spanish television series endings
Television series set in the 1950s
Television shows set in Spain